Nazar Ghazali (Arabic: نزار غزالي, born 10 April 1984, in Duhok, Iraq), is a professional Kurdish, Iraqi Bodybuilding, The first Kurdish athlete in the field of bodybuilding, holds high certificates in the field of bodybuilding and the owner of the highest championships in the region, and is a personal trainer for President Nechirvan Barzani, President of the Iraqi Kurdistan region.

Competitive history 
 2000, first place in Duhok championship, at the Iraq level.
 2001, first place in the Iraq championship in Mosul.
 2003, first place in Kurdistan championship.
 2004, golden medal in Arabic countries championship in Jordan.
 2004, silver medal in the Asian championship which held in Bahrain.
 2009, first place and got a golden medal in Asian championship in Thailand.
 2011, seventh place world championship which in India.
 2013, first place in the international championship in Hungary to wrap the golden necklace around his neck.
 2014, second place and silver medal in Arnold Classic championship in Madrid Spain.
 2016, first placethe and golden medal in IFBB (Diamond cup) championship in Athena Greece.

See also 

 List of IFBB member federations
List of male professional bodybuilders.
IFBB Professional League

References

External links 
 Official Nazar Ghazali web site
 Nazar Ghazali on instagram.
 Nazar Ghazali on Telegram.
 Nazar Ghazali on Facebook.
 List of Ghazali international Certifications
 Gomhuria arabic magazine talks about Nizar Ghazali.
 IFBB Diamond Cup Athens.
 List of Ghazali International Championships.

Sport in Iraq
1984 births
Male bodybuilders
Living people
Professional bodybuilders